This is a list of fictional political parties of various countries.

Australia

 Australian People's Party - The Honourable Wally Norman
 Total Country Party - The Honourable Wally Norman

Confederate States of America

 Confederate Party - The Guns of the South
 Freedom Party - American Empire, Settling Accounts
 Patriot Party - The Guns of the South
 Radical Liberal Party - Great War, American Empire
Redemption League - American Empire
 Whig Party - Great War, American Empire

Japan

 Friendship Democratic Party - 20th Century Boys
 The Restoration Party for Future - The Final Judgement

Netherlands

 Lijst "de snor" (list "moustache") - Kopspijkers
 Tegenpartij - Van Kooten and De Bie
 De Partij tegen de Burger ("The party against the Citizen") - De Speld

Russia
 Ultranationalist Party -  Call of Duty: Modern Warfare series
 Ushi Party - Empire Earth

United Kingdom

 Adder Party - Blackadder the Third
Albion First! - Command & Conquer
 Bald Brummies Against The Big-Footed Conspiracy Party - Knowing Me, Knowing You... with Alan Partridge
Black Shorts - Jeeves series by P. G. Wodehouse
Bouncing Party - The Goodies Rule – O.K.?
British Republic Party - Avalon by Stephen R. Lawhead
The British Way - "Spooks"
Brotherhood of British Freemen ("Greenshirts") - Point Counter Point by Aldous Huxley
 Comfy Sweaters Lets Not Be Too Hasty Party (CSLNBTHP) - Spitting Image
 Common Sense Party - Something Rotten, Party's Over
 Conservation Party - The Beiderbecke Affair
 Conservationists, Democrats and Socialist Workers' Party — Shadowrun (London sourcebook)
 Conservative-Labour Party and Labour-Conservative Party — the Rumpole novels of John Mortimer.
 Darkie Power Party - "Election Night Special" episode of Monty Python's Flying Circus
 David Owen Party (parody of the reformed SDP) - Spitting Image
 English Socialist Party - Nineteen Eighty-Four
 Four Star Party (populist, far-right party) - Years and Years
 Fight Dutch Elm Disease and Build More Houses Party (fringe party) - Terry and June
 Government Party - Ali G Indahouse
 Industrial Radical Party - The Difference Engine by William Gibson and Bruce Sterling
 Keep Royalty White, Rat Catching And Safe Sewage Residents' Party - Blackadder the Third
 Little Bit of Politics Party (LBP) - Spitting Image
 Max Walling Party - The Goodies Rule – O.K.?
 McKenzie Square Dancing Party - The Goodies Rule – O.K.?
 Monarchists - TekWar
 National Bocialist Party (led by Mr. Hilter) - from Monty Python's Flying Circus
 National Democratic League - The New Order: Last Days of Europe
 National Socialist Party of Britain - The Bill
 New Patriotic Party (merger of Eurosceptic factions of the Conservatives and Labour parties) - The New Statesman
 Norsefire - V for Vendetta
 People's Party - Hercule Poirot short story The Augean Stables
 The Progressive Federalists (merger of the pro-EU factions of the Conservatives and Labour parties) - The New Statesman
 Purple Alliance - The Amazing Mrs Pritchard
 Reform Party - In the Red and sequels by Mark Tavener
 Roundheads - TekWar
 Royal Party - The New Order: Last Days of Europe
 Saxon Party - Doctor Who episodes "The Sound of Drums" and "The Last of the Time Lords" (mentioned in others).
 Sensible Party - "Election Night Special" episode of Monty Python's Flying Circus
 Silly Party - "Election Night Special" episode of Monty Python's Flying Circus
Silver Shirts - American Empire, Settling Accounts
 Slightly Silly Party - "Election Night Special" episode of Monty Python's Flying Circus
Socialist Labour Party - The New Order: Last Days of Europe
 Standing at the Back Dressed Stupidly and Looking Stupid Party - from Blackadder the Third
 String 'Em Up Party (SEU) - Spitting Image
 Stone Dead Party - "Election Night Special" episode of Monty Python's Flying Circus
 Tooting Popular Front - Citizen Smith
 Twig Party (a Third Way party “combining the best aspects of both” the Tories and Whigs; the name "Whory" was rejected outright) - Bleak Expectations Series 2, Episode 3 "A Recovery All Made Miserable"
 United England - The New Order: Last Days of Europe
 United Kingdom Racist Party - Fags, Mags and Bags Series 1, Episode 6 "January February"
 Very Silly Party - "Election Night Special" episode of Monty Python's Flying Circus
 Waltzing Party - The Goodies Rule – O.K.?
 White Monarchy Death off the Road Slitty Eyes Go Home Gas Badgers Pull Your Finger Out Party - Spitting Image
 Why Can't My Son Get A Decent Job Rather Than Nancing Around with A Group of Pansies on Saturday Superstore Party - Spitting Image
 Women Against Nylon Knitware - Hamish and Dougal
 Wood Party - from Monty Python's Flying Circus Series 1, Episode 12 "The Naked Ant"

United States of America

 All-Night Party - Marvel Universe, but also a real-life frivolous political party
 American Freedom Pool Party - Animaniacs
 After Party - suggested by Greg Gutfeld 
 ASS Party - Antisocial Socialist Party Mascot: Ostrich with head in a [corn]hole.
 American House Party - Animaniacs
 America Now Party - The Dead Zone
 American Socialist White People's Party (also called the "Illinois Nazis") - The Blues Brothers
 American Survivalist Labor Committee - American Flagg
 Anal Compulsive Party - Dave Barry Slept Here: A Sort of History of the United States
 Bipartisan Party - Death Race 2000
 Blacks' party - O Presidente Negro
 The Clean US Party (CUSP) - Infinite Jest
 The Church of Scientology (Fictional Political Party) - Dave Barry Slept Here: A Sort of History of the United States
 Common Ground Party (a parallel universe's Democratic Party) - Mathematicians in Love
 Corporatist Party (nicknamed 'Corpos') - It Can't Happen Here by Sinclair Lewis
 The Del-Vikings - Dave Barry Slept Here: A Sort of History of the United States
 The Eternal Man Party - The World's Greatest Sinner
 Free Watoga People's Party - Fallout 76
 Gallatinist Party - The Probability Broach by L. Neil Smith
 God's Lightning Party - The Illuminatus! Trilogy by Robert Shea and Robert Anton Wilson
 Grange Party - The Iron Heel by Jack London (loosely based on the real Grange movement)
 Haiku Party - Dave Barry Hits Below the Beltway
 Heritagist Party (a parallel universe's Republican Party) - Mathematicians in Love
 The Home Boys - Dave Barry Slept Here: A Sort of History of the United States
 Independence Party -  The Two Georges by Harry Turtledove and Richard Dreyfuss
 Jeffersonian Party - It Can't Happen Here by Sinclair Lewis and Warrior Class by Dale Brown
 Libertarian Immortalist - Schrödinger's Cat trilogy
 Liberty Party (a far more extreme version of the Republicans) - Coyote by Allen Steele
 Meadow Party - Bloom County
 Men's Party - O Presidente Negro
 Marxist League (actually the name of several Communist groups, though not in the USA) - Bill Bailey (Ultimate Sectarian) by Joe Glazer and Bill Friedman
 National Progressive Pact (Coalition) - The New Order: Last Days of Europe
Progressive Party
Nationalist Party
All-American National Vanguard
 The National Surrealist Light People's Party - Not Insane or Anything You Want To by The Firesign Theatre
 New Federalist - Kingdom Come by Elliot S. Maggin
 The New Founding Fathers of America - The Purge (film)
 New Morality - Grand Tour series by Ben Bova 
 Party of Girls - Barbie
 People's Ecology Party - Schrödinger's Cat trilogy
 Pink Party - Pinky and the Brain
 Prehistoric Zucchini Party - Dave Barry Hits Below the Beltway
 Propertarian Party - The Probability Broach by L. Neil Smith
 Ralph Nader Party - Dave Barry Hits Below the Beltway
 Royalty Party - Emperor of America by Richard Condon
 Surprise Party - Animaniacs
 The Replacement Party - Nashville
 The Sharks - Dave Barry Slept Here: A Sort of History of the United States
 Surprise Party - Gracie Allen's attempt to run for President in the 1940 presidential election as a publicity stunt.
 Survivalist Party - Ecotopia by Ernest Callenbach
 Super American America Party - Animaniacs
 Tomorrow Party - DC Comics (composed at least partially by Democrats)
 U.S. Christian Conservative Party - Rama II
 United States First Party - Tom Clancy's Op-Center by Jeff Rovin
 Wing Nut Party - Dave Barry Hits Below the Beltway
 Women's Party - O Presidente Negro

Other, unknown, or fictional countries

 The Founders - in BioShock Infinite is only political party for the citizens in Columbia.
Animalism - in George Orwell's Animal Farm
 Death-Worship - in Eastasia, George Orwell's Nineteen Eighty-Four
 Fist of Allah Party - in Jordan, from Command & Conquer
 Government Democratic Party - The First President of Japan
 D.M.D.Y.D. (State-Nation-Democracy Solidarity Party) from Koltuk Belası, Kemal Sunal's, Turkey
 Destek Partisi (Assistance Party), Zübük, Aziz Nesin's, Turkey
 Ingsoc - in Oceania, George Orwell's Nineteen Eighty-Four
 Horst Schlämmer Party - Germany, in Horst Schlämmer – Isch kandidiere!
 Human Renaissance Party - in the High Republic of Heldon, in Norman Spinrad's The Iron Dream
 Hynkel Party - the ruling Nazi-styled fascist party of Tomainia.
 Independent Future Party - Red Dwarf episode Mechocracy, run by Kryten and Dave Lister
 Lovely Fluffy Liberal Alliance Party - Red Dwarf episode Mechocracy, run by Arnold Rimmer and Cat
 M.I.S.T. - in Dead or Alive video game series.
 Napaloni Party - the ruling party of Bacteria, styled on Italian fascism.
 Nazty Party - Ruling party of Moronica in You Nazty Spy! and I'll Never Heil Again
 Neo-Bolshevism - in Eurasia, George Orwell's Nineteen Eighty-Four
New Apathetic Party - Canada, in Royal Canadian Air Farce
 South Park
 Allied Atheist Alliance
 United Allied Atheists
 Unified Atheist League
 Taschist Party - Ruling party of Borduria in The Adventures of Tintin
 UN Party - in Japan, in Killer7
 The Irish Republican Party - Command & Conquer

Monty Python's Life of Brian

 The Judean People's Front
 The People's Front of Judea
 Judean Popular People's Front
 Campaign for a Free Galilee

Foundation series

Actionist Party - Made by opponents of Salvor Hardin
Democratic Underground Party - Resistance movement against first the Indbur dynasty, and then the Mule

Futurama
List of political parties of the Earthican Government:

 Antisocialists
 Brainslug Party
 Bull Space Moose Party
 Dudes For the Legalation of Hemp 
 Fingerlicans (pun on Republicans)
 Green Party (members are literally green)
 National Raygun Association (pun on the National Rifle Association, though not actually a political party)
 One Cell, One Vote
 People for the Ethical Treatment of Humans 
 Rainbow Whigs Party
 Tastycrats (pun on Democrats)
 Voter Apathy Party

Honorverse

Centrist Party - Star Kingdom of Manticore
Citizen Rights Party - People's Republic of Haven
Conservative Association - Star Kingdom of Manticore
Constitutional Progressive - Republic of Haven
Corporate Conservative - Republic of Haven
Crown Loyalists - Star Kingdom of Manticore
Legislaturists - People's Republic of Haven
Liberal Party - Star Kingdom of Manticore
New Conservative - Republic of Haven
New Democrat - Republic of Haven
New Men Party - Star Kingdom of Manticore
Progressive Party - Star Kingdom of Manticore

Star Wars expanded universe

Centerpoint Party - Corellia
Human League - Corellia
Loyalists - Galactic Republic
Rationalist Party - New Republic
Rights of Sentience Party - New Republic
Centrists - New Republic
Populists - New Republic
Separatists - Galactic Republic

Star Trek Expanded Universe

 Jaridan, Nej'ahar, Jol Tan, and Suketh Coalitions - Romulan Star Empire (Star Trek: The Next Generation Role-playing Game)

See also
 List of fictional politicians
 List of fictional U.S. Presidents
 List of fictional British monarchs
 List of fictional British Prime Ministers
 List of frivolous political parties

References

Political parties, List of fictional